The Ministry of Finance is a government ministry of Laos responsible for public finances according to party regulation, guideline and policy.

Ministers of Finance of the Kingdom of Laos
Outhong Souvannavong, 1947
Leuam Insisiengmay, 1947-1949
Phao Panya, 1949-1950
Katay Don Sasorith, 1951-1954
Leuam Insisiengmay, 1954-1958
Leuam Rajasombath, 1958-1959
Leuam Insisiengmay, 1959
Somsanith Vongkotrattana, 1959-1960
Leuam Rajasombath, 1960
Inpeng Sourignatay, 1960
Khamking Souvanlasy, 1960
Inpeng Souriyathay, 1960
Phouangphet Phanareth, 1960-1962
Phoumi Nosavan, 1962-1965
Sisouk na Champassak, 1965-1974
Ngon Sananikone, 1974-1975
Leuam Rajasombath, 1975

Ministers of Finance of the Lao People's Democratic Republic
Nouhak Phoumsavan, 1975-1983
Yao Phonvantha, 1983-1989
Sali Vongkhamsao, 1989-1991
Khamphoui Keoboualapha, 1991 
Khamsai Souphanouvong, 1991-1995
Saysomphone Phomvihane, 1995-1998
Khamphoui Keoboualapha, 1998-1999
Boungnang Vorachith, 1999-2001
Soukanh Mahalath, 2001-2003
Chansy Phosikham, 2003-2007
Somdy Douangdy, 2007-2011
Phouphet Khamphounvong, 2011-2014
Lien Thikeo, 2014-2016
Somdy Douangdy, 2016-2021 
Bounchom Oubonpaserth, 2021-present

See also
Government of Laos
Bank of the Lao P.D.R.
Economy of Laos

References

Politics of Laos
Political organizations based in Laos
Ministries of the Government of Laos
Economy of Laos
Laos
1947 establishments in Laos